Gerivan(also Romanized as Gerīvān) is a village in Aladagh Rural District, in the Central District of Bojnord County, North Khorasan Province, Iran. 

The local language is Turkmen.

References 

Populated places in Bojnord County